Niggaz4Life (also known as EFIL4ZAGGIN as per album cover art, stylized in all caps and horizontally mirrored) is the second and final studio album by gangsta rap group N.W.A, released on May 28, 1991. It was their final album, as the group disbanded later the same year after the departure of Dr. Dre and songwriter The D.O.C. to form Death Row Records; the album features only four members of the original line-up, as Ice Cube and Arabian Prince had already left the group in 1989 and 1988 respectively. Niggaz4Life debuted at number 2 on the Billboard 200, but in its second week peaked at number 1.

In 1992, several months after the release of the album, N.W.A released a video named Niggaz4Life: The Only Home Video, which chronicled the making of the album and its three music videos, "Alwayz into Somethin'", "Appetite for Destruction" and "Approach to Danger".

In 2002, the CD was re-released in two formats. Both had the EP 100 Miles and Runnin' appended to the end of the original track listing, but one was available with a DVD copy of Niggaz4Life: The Only Home Video.

In comparison to its predecessor, the album was also heavier on misogyny, for which it became notorious. The songs on the album's second half featured more profanity, sexist themes, and references to various sexual acts, provoking the ire of the PMRC, liberal and conservative politicians, and civil rights activist C. Delores Tucker.

Critical reception
Upon release, Niggaz4Life generally polarized music critics, as many were divided over its lyrics especially in the 2nd half of the album. The Source, the most prominent hip hop publication at the time, declared it one of their albums of the year but more “mainstream” publications like Rolling Stone condemned the album. In a two star review (out of five), Rolling Stone critic Arion Berger attacked Niggaz4Life as “so hateful toward women, and in such a pathetic and sleazy manner, that it’s simply tiresome.” Mark Blackwell, of Spin magazine, similarly opined in his interview of N.W.A. that Niggaz4Life “wears thin pretty fast. The main problem is that the old ‘niggas’ and ‘bitches’ thing – whether offensive or not – is getting a little tired” before conceding that “Dre and Yella’s production is peerless.”

In a negative review, Newsweek deemed the album "by N.W.A standards, is a mediocre work, a retreat from cinematic storytelling into simple punk bluster." Time wrote, "N.W.A. raps nasty and righteous, with real ghetto heat, and doesn't give an inch," calling the album "incendiary" and "grotesque."

Later DJ Yella said: “I do like the second album better than the first. The first one had more hits, but production-wise I like this one better. It would have been great if Cube would have got on that album. But it sounds better, we put more into it.”

The album received more positive reviews since then, especially for the production. Tom Doggett from Rap Reviews said: “Niggaz4life is a frightening album, jammed with explosive beats, visceral skits, and inciting rhymes. There is an overwhelming sense of sensual stimulation that overcomes the room when this album is playing. The eighteen tracks move by effortlessly, jumping from shootout skits to Ice Cube disses to revolting accounts of sexual acts. Even if you are turned off, it is impossible to deny the kinetic force that exudes from this album“

Jesse Ducker from Albumism also praised the production and said: ”Efil4zaggin stands as a very dope, albeit flawed, piece of work.“

Accolades

Ranked #1 in The Sources Top 15 Albums of 1991 list in 1991
Ranked #7 in MTV's Greatest Hip-Hop Albums of All Time list in 2005

Commercial performance
The album debuted number 2 on the US Billboard Top LPs chart. It went on to top the Billboard 200, becoming the first album by a rap group to top the chart.

Track listing
Songwriting credits are adapted from the CD liner notes. All songs produced by Dr. Dre and DJ Yella.

Sample credits

"Prelude"
"Hyperbolicsyllabicsesquedalymistic" by Isaac Hayes 
"The Breakdown (Part II)" by Rufus Thomas

"Real Niggaz Don't Die"
 "UFO" by ESG
 "Different Strokes" by Syl Johnson
 "Die Nigger!!!" by The Last Poets
 "Rise Above" by Black Flag
 "Long Red" by Mountain
 "I Just Want to Celebrate" by Rare Earth
 "Synthetic Substitution" by Melvin Bliss
 "Hook and Sling" by Eddie Bo
 "Big Beat" by Billy Squier
 "Triple Threat" by Z-3 MC's

"Niggaz 4 Life"
 "Die Nigger!!!" by The Last Poets
 "Sir Nose d'Voidoffunk (Pay Attention - B3M)" by Parliament
 "Flashlight" by Parliament
 "N.T." by Kool & the Gang
 "(Don't Worry) If There's a Hell Below, We're All Going to Go" by Curtis Mayfield
 "Niggers Are Scared of a Revolution" by The Last Poets
 "Cissy Strut" by The Meters
 "Fool Yourself" by Little Feat

"Appetite for Destruction"
 "Think (About It)" by Lyn Collins
 "Funky Stuff" by Kool and the Gang
 "Get Me Back on Time, Engine No. 9" by Wilson Pickett
 "Niggers vs. the Police" by Richard Pryor

"Don't Drink That Wine"
 "I've Been Watching You (Move Your Sexy Body)" by Parliament
 "If It Ain't Ruff" by N.W.A
"Alwayz into Somethin'"
 "Stone to the Bone" by James Brown
 "Storm King" by Bob James
 "Sneakin' in the Back" by Tom Scott and The L.A. Express
 "Remember" by Jimi Hendrix
 "Synthetic Substitution" by Melvin Bliss
 "Just Wanna Make A Dream Come True" by Mass Production

"Message to B.A."
 "Prelude" by N.W.A

"Real Niggaz"
 "Give it Up" by Kool & the Gang
 "Got to Be Real" by Cheryl Lynn
 "Gashman" by The Last Poets
 "The Lovomaniacs" by Boobie Knight & the Universal Lady

"To Kill a Hooker"
 "Can't Stay Away" by Bootsy Collins

"One Less Bitch"
 "Zimba Ku" by Black Heat
 "Funkin' 4 Jamaica" by Tom Browne
 "I'm Gonna Love You Just a Little More, Babe" by Barry White

"Findum, Fuckum & Flee"
 "Rapper's Delight" by the Sugarhill Gang
 "The Breakdown, Pt. 1" by Rufus Thomas

"Automobile"
 "My Automobile" by Parliament

"She Swallowed It"
 "Cardova" by The Meters
 "I'm Gonna Love You Just a Little More, Babe" by Barry White
 "That Girl is a Slut" by Just-Ice
 "Slack Jawed Leroy" by Leroy & Skillet with LaWanda Page

"I'd Rather Fuck You"
 "I'd Rather Be with You" by Bootsy Collins

"Approach to Danger"
 "AJ Scratch" by Kurtis Blow
 "Get up & Get Down" by The Dramatics
 "Get Me Back on Time, Engine No. 9" by Wilson Pickett
 "God Made Me Funky" by The Headhunters
 "Scorpio" by Lalo Schifrin
 "This Is It" by Jimmy Spicer

"1-900-2-Compton"
 "P. Funk (Wants to Get Funked Up)" by Parliament

"The Dayz of Wayback"
 "Troglodyte" by Jimmy Castor Bunch
 "Impreach the President" by The Honey Drippers
 "Players Balling (Players Doin' Their Own Thing)" by Ohio Players
 "On the Ill Tip" by LL Cool J
 "Surprises" by The Last Poets
 "Niggaz4Life" by N.W.A

Appearances

Charts

Weekly charts

Year-end charts

Certifications

References

External links

N.W.A albums
1991 albums
Albums produced by Dr. Dre
Albums produced by DJ Yella
Ruthless Records albums
G-funk albums
Gangsta rap albums by American artists